Astriclypeus mannii is a species of sea urchin of the family Astriclypeidae. Their armour is covered with spines. It is placed in the genus Astriclypeus and lives in the sea. Astriclypeus mannii was first scientifically described in 1867 by Verrill.

References 

Astriclypeidae